Ann Margaret Veneman (born June 29, 1949) is an American attorney who served as the fifth executive director of UNICEF from 2005 to 2010. She previously served as the 27th United States Secretary of Agriculture from 2001 to 2005, and was the first, and to date the only, woman to hold that post. Veneman served for the entire first term of President George W. Bush, and she left to take the UNICEF position. Appointed by the U.N. Secretary-General Kofi Annan on January 18, 2005, she took over the post on May 1, 2005. A lawyer, Veneman has practiced law in Washington, DC and California, including being a deputy public defender.  She has also served in other high level positions in U.S. federal and state government, including being appointed California's Secretary of Food and Agriculture, serving from 1995 to 1999.

Veneman serves as a co-leader of the Nutrition and Physical Activity Initiative at the Bipartisan Policy Center. She is a member of the Council on Foreign Relations.

Early life and education
Veneman was raised on a peach farm in Modesto, California. Her father, John Veneman, was former undersecretary of Health, Education and Welfare and member of the California State Assembly.  She earned her bachelor's degree in political science from the University of California, Davis, a Master of Public Policy from the Richard & Rhoda Goldman School of Public Policy at the University of California, Berkeley, and a Juris Doctor degree from the University of California, Hastings College of the Law.  She has also been awarded honorary doctoral degrees from California Polytechnic State University, San Luis Obispo (2001); Lincoln University (Missouri) (2003); Delaware State University (2004) and Middlebury College (2006).

Legal, political and corporate career

Veneman began her legal career as a staff attorney with the General Counsel's office of the Bay Area Rapid Transit District in Oakland, California, in 1976.  In 1978, she returned to Modesto, where she served as a Deputy Public Defender.  In 1980, she joined the Modesto law firm of Damrell, Damrell and Nelson, where she was an associate and later a partner.

Veneman joined the United States Department of Agriculture's Foreign Agricultural Service in 1986, serving as Associate Administrator until 1989. During this time she worked on the Uruguay Round talks for the General Agreement on Tariffs and Trade (GATT). She subsequently served as Deputy Undersecretary of Agriculture for International Affairs and Commodity Programs from 1989 to 2020. From 1991 to 1993, she served as United States Department of Agriculture's Deputy Secretary, the first woman appointed as the Department's second-highest-ranking official. At this point Veneman took a break from political and administrative office to practice with the law firm and lobby group Patton, Boggs & Blow and also served on several boards of directors and advisory groups.

In 1995, Veneman re-entered government, when she was appointed Secretary of the California Department of Food and Agriculture, again being the first woman to hold the position. From 1999 to 2001, Veneman was an attorney with Nossaman LLP, where she focused her attention on food, agriculture, environment, technology, and trade related issues. On 20 January 2001 she was unanimously confirmed by the United States Senate and sworn in as Secretary of Agriculture, a position she held until January 20, 2005.

Personal life and distinctions

Veneman has received several awards and distinctions throughout her career.  In 2009, Veneman was named to the Forbes 100 Most Powerful Women list, ranking 46th.

In 2009, she received the Award of Distinction from the University of California Davis College of Agricultural and Environmental Sciences. Veneman is an Honorary Member of Rotary International (2008), received Sesame Workshop's Leadership Award for Children (2006), and a Humanitarian Award from the United Nations Association of New York (2006). In 2004, Veneman was honored with an Honorary Membership with the U.S. State Department's U.S.-Afghan Women's Council and an Honorary Membership with Sigma Alpha Sorority, the national professional agriculture sorority. She was also awarded the Main Street Partnership John Chaffee Award for Distinguished Public Service, the American PVO Partners Award for Service to People in Need, and the Grape & Wine Public Policy Leadership Award.  Additional awards include the Richard E. Lyng Award for Public Service (2005), the UC Berkeley Goldman School of Public Policy Alumni of the Year Award (2003), the California State Fair's Agriculturalist of the Year Award (2003), and the National 4-H Alumni Recognition Award. In 2002, Veneman received the California Council for International Trade Golden State Award, the Dutch American Heritage Award, Junior Statesman Foundation Statesman of the Year Award and the United Fresh Fruit & Vegetable Distinguished Service Award.  In 2001, Veneman received the Outstanding Woman in International Trade Award, the UC Davis Outstanding Alumna of the Year Award and the Food Research and Action Center Award.  In 1995, she received a Cal Aggie Alumni Citation for Excellence and the Kiwanis Club of Greater Modesto National Farm-City Week Award.

Veneman is currently a board member of Malaria No More, a New York-based nonprofit that was launched at the 2006 White House Summit with the goal of ending all deaths caused by malaria.  Veneman is also co-chair of Mothers Day Every Day, along with former U.S. President Bill Clinton's Health and Human Services Secretary Donna Shalala. The "campaign was launched by CARE and the White Ribbon Alliance supporting access of basic health care and maternal services for women around the world." Veneman also serves as a board member of the Close Up Foundation, a civic education organization, and has served previously on a number of advisory councils and committees, particularly those involving higher education.

In 2002, Veneman was diagnosed with breast cancer and received successful treatment. Veneman is also a second cousin of Star Wars creator George Lucas.

Record as Secretary of Agriculture

As the 27th Secretary of the U.S. Department of Agriculture (USDA), Veneman managed a department of 111,000 employees. Sworn in as the first female Secretary of USDA on January 20, 2001, her tenure included record farm income, record agricultural exports and the creation of stronger pest and disease protection systems for the country.

U.S. Senator Tom Harkin said at Veneman's confirmation hearing, "I was encouraged by the nomination of Ann Veneman to serve as Secretary of Agriculture. …She has solid experience and credentials in administering food and agriculture programs both here in Washington, rising to Deputy Secretary of Agriculture, and in her home state of California, where she served as Secretary of the California Department of Food and Agriculture."

BluePrint for Agriculture

To help lead USDA into the 21st century, in 2001 Veneman released a blueprint for agriculture, Food and Agricultural Policy: Taking Stock for the New Century. "This publication outlines emerging trends in agriculture, with a focus on farm-sector policy, trade expansion, infrastructure enhancement, conservation and the environment, rural communities, nutrition and food assistance, and USDA program integration."

Protection of Agriculture and the Food Supply

Within weeks after taking office, Veneman confronted the outbreak of foot and mouth disease in Europe, prompting stronger sanitary and phytosanitary measures. After the September 11, 2001 attacks, additional protections were implemented.  She also provided strong leadership in protecting public health and animal health during outbreaks of avian influenza and exotic Newcastle disease in poultry, both of which were quickly eradicated. USDA also confronted various food safety recalls, prompting Veneman to take several actions to strengthen USDA's regulatory oversight and protections.

On December 23, 2003, Veneman announced the discovery of a single cow with Bovine spongiform encephalopathy (BSE), or mad cow disease, in Washington State.  This would be the very first incident of mad cow disease in the United States. The cow was determined to be of Canadian origin. After taking initial steps in response, one week later, on December 30, 2003, Veneman announced additional protective measures to be put into place. [4] These included a ban on "downer," or nonambulatory cattle, from the human food supply; additional food-safety measures in the processing of beef and related products; and an acceleration of "the development of the technology architecture" for a national system to track and identify livestock. 

BSE proved to be a complex issue on the international-trade front.  U.S. trading partners made sometimes-conflicting demands on the United States, while public-interest, consumer and farm groups called for differing protection measures and responses.

Japan, the leading U.S. beef-export market, had been demanding 100 percent testing of all cattle for export, a position it has since altered.

Public-interest groups also called for the closing of loopholes in the so-called "animal-feed ban," which prevented the feeding of ruminant products back to ruminants, which had been discovered as a key-pathway for BSE transmission.  The feed ban falls under the purview of the Food and Drug Administration.

International Trade

Veneman, was widely praised for her knowledge and leadership in advancing international trade. "She worked closely with U.S. Trade Representative Robert Zoellick, helping lead to the successful launch of a new round of trade negotiations for the World Trade Organization" in Doha.  She played a key role in helping eliminate trade barriers and expanding opportunities for U.S. farmers through new export markets. U.S. agricultural exports in 2004 rose to a record $62.3 billion.

Child Nutrition and Food Programs

During Veneman's tenure, the Food Stamp Program and child nutrition program were reauthorized and funding increased, strengthening the ability of USDA to provide services to recipients and provide additional accountability to taxpayers.  In 2004, Veneman finalized the transition from paper food stamps to electronic debit cards in an effort to reduce fraud and increase availability of these programs to more families in need. Under Veneman, after a comprehensive scientific review, new Dietary Guidelines for Americans were released, which formed the basis for USDA's MyPyramid.

Carol Tucker-Foreman of the Consumer Federation of America said of Veneman, "Secretary Veneman recognized the increasing problem of obesity in this country and took some steps to begin to address it. Under her direction USDA updated the Dietary Guidelines and is revising the food guide pyramid."

As Secretary, Veneman focused on new approaches to help feed the hungry around the world. To help meet the international goal of reducing global hunger by half by 2015, she organized and hosted in 2003 the Ministerial Conference on Science and Technology, which brought together ministers from 120 nations to California, to discuss how science and technology can reduce hunger and poverty in the developing world. The conference, as well as subsequent regional conferences and follow-up activities, helped recapture the momentum of the World Food Summit.

USDA Management and Programs

As part of several actions to implement the President's Management Agenda (PMA), Veneman began USDA's e-Government Initiative, which made an unprecedented array of programs and services available electronically.  In addition, USDA for the first time ever received a clean financial audit, a status the department attained three years in a row.

Veneman established USDA's 'Leaders of Tomorrow' initiative to support agriculture education and related mentoring.  She increased the number of internships available at USDA, and encouraged young people to seek career opportunities at USDA and across the food and agricultural spectrum.

Record as UNICEF Executive Director

In her tenure as executive director from 2005 to 2010, Veneman like her predecessors, continued to foster a culture of improvement working to strengthen the results-based focus of the organization to most effectively and sustainably achieve the rights of children, in line with the convention on the Rights of the Child. Veneman continued the work of her predecessors to enhance the following:

Child-mother health

Veneman has highlighted the inextricable link between the health of the mother and the health of the child in UNICEF.  Along with WHO, the World Bank and UNFPA, UNICEF is accelerating maternal health interventions in the highest burden countries.  Nutrition is now widely recognized as integral to both health and food security, with particular attention to children under age two whose cognitive ability will likely be permanently diminished without adequate nourishment in those formative years.

Malnutrition

UNICEF has significantly contributed to accelerating the use of ready-to-use therapeutic foods for treatment of acute malnutrition, with UNICEF purchases of the product increasing from 100 metric tons in 2003 to over 11,000 metric tons in 2008.  Vitamin A and zinc supplementation, salt iodization, and flour fortification have all been scaled up and rates of exclusive breastfeeding have improved.  UNICEF has strategically invested in nutrition programs when global food prices rose, and its recently released nutrition scorecard report provides data and evidence on the nutritional status of children.

Protecting children

In February 2007 UNICEF co-hosted a worldwide conference with France, bringing together representatives from 58 countries including those most affected by the use of child soldiers to end this practice. According to UNICEF over 27,000 children in different parts of the world are believed to have been used on the frontlines during armed conflicts in 2006 alone. To address this, the Conference resulted in the release of what is known as The Paris Principles, a detailed set of guidelines for protecting children from recruitment and for providing effective assistance to those already involved with armed groups or forces.

Women and girls

Veneman has helped bring more awareness to the plight of women and girls.  Saying, "if we care about the health and well-being of children today and into the future, we must work now to ensure that women and girls have equal opportunities to be educated, to participate in government, to achieve economic self-sufficiency and to be protected from violence and discrimination."  UNICEF has launched key interventions to enhance gender equality around the world. "Despite progress in women's status in recent decades, the lives of millions of girls and women are still overshadowed by discrimination, disempowerment and poverty." "Millions of women...are subject to physical and sexual violence, with little recourse to justice."

In 2007, Veneman helped launch a partnership with renowned US playwright and 'V-Day' founder Eve Ensler in 2007, to bring awareness and change to the sexual abuse and violence of women in the DRC.  'Stop Raping our Greatest Resource' is a campaign initiated by the women of eastern DRC along with UNICEF and V-Day, a global movement to end violence against women and girls. UNICEF estimates that hundreds of thousands of women and girls have been raped since the conflict began in eastern DRC more than a decade ago.

Veneman has also called for greater efforts to end female genital mutilation.  In February 2009, marking the International Day against the harmful practice that three million girls and women endure each year, Veneman said, "Some 70 million girls and women alive today have been subjected to female genital cutting. While some communities have made real progress in abandoning this dangerous practice, the rights, and even the lives, of too many girls continue to be threatened."

Organizational effectiveness

UNICEF's financial and organizational position has continued to improve due to its reputation.  Between 2004 and 2008, total income, including trust funds, has increased more than 60%, to over $4 billion.  The organization's accountability mechanisms have been strengthened, audit compliance has improved, an office of investigation established, and an ethics officer appointed.

In December 2009, UN Secretary-General Ban Ki-moon said of Veneman, "She has fulfilled her mandate with immense dedication, and I have been impressed by her extraordinary energy and determination to improve children's health, education and well-being around the world.  Under her leadership, UNICEF has become a catalyst for global action to help children reach their full potential, promoting collaborations that deliver the best possible results for children based on expert knowledge, sound evidence and data.  She has been a champion of United Nations coherence and a strong voice for children as well as Millennium Development Goal implementation.  Her legacy is an organization that is financially and intellectually strong and well-equipped to meet the challenges children face in the twenty-first century."

In 2009, Veneman was named to Forbes Magazine's List of The World's 100 Most Powerful Women, ranking #46.  Forbes cited Veneman in part because she "played a key role in the joint effort by UNICEF, the World Health Organization, the United Nations Population Fund and the World Bank to help accelerate progress on maternal and newborn health in the 25 countries with the highest rates of infant mortality worldwide."

Mrs. Veneman was succeeded by Anthony Lake on May 1, 2010.

Nestlé 
After her time with UNICEF, Veneman served as an adviser to Nestlé and took a seat on Nestlé's board of directors. Nutrition campaign groups criticized Veneman's involvement with Nestlé because of the company's violation of a global code restricting advertising of breast milk substitutes.

Gay rights
In 2015, Veneman signed an amicus brief asking the United States Supreme Court to nationally recognize same-sex marriage.

See also
 List of female United States Cabinet members
 List of first women lawyers and judges in California

References

External links
Executive Director Ann M. Veneman at UNICEF
White House biography
USDA biography

Articles
Secretary puts experience to work in mad cow case
Video | UNICEF chief Ann Veneman on refuting those who "undermine" vaccination programs and speaking against child marriage.
Secretary-General Praises Ann Veneman's Immense Dedication, Energy, Determination
Ann Veneman on The Washington Post On Leadership Series
Lancet-Ann Veneman: getting UNICEF back to basics
BigThink Interview with Ann Veneman on Children's Rights
Agriculture Veteran Gets Job of Her Dreams: Washington Post
Bush Makes Peach of an Appointment, Los Angeles Times

|-

|-

1949 births
Living people
21st-century American politicians
21st-century American women politicians
American officials of the United Nations
American nonprofit executives
George W. Bush administration cabinet members
California Republicans
Goldman School of Public Policy alumni
People from Modesto, California
Public defenders
State cabinet secretaries of California
UNICEF people
Under-Secretaries-General of the United Nations
United States Deputy Secretaries of Agriculture
United States Secretaries of Agriculture
University of California, Davis alumni
University of California, Hastings College of the Law alumni
Women business executives
Women in California politics
Women members of the Cabinet of the United States
Women nonprofit executives